Haitham al-Ghais (born October 1969) is a Kuwaiti oil executive who currently serves as the Secretary General of OPEC.

Al-Ghais was unanimously appointed by representatives of OPEC member states on 1 January 2022. He was to take office in Vienna on 1 August, but took over early following the death of Nigerian politician Mohammad Barkindo on 5 July.

References

1969 births
Living people
Secretaries General of OPEC
Kuwaiti politicians
People from Kuwait City
20th-century Kuwaiti businesspeople
21st-century Kuwaiti businesspeople
University of San Francisco alumni